Luang Namtha Museum, also Louang Namtha Provincial Museum, is a museum in Luang Namtha, Laos. Largely an anthropological museum, it contains numerous items related to local people such as ethnic clothing, Khamu bronze drums, textiles, ceramics, tools, household utensils, hand-crafted weapons, and Buddhism-related items.

References

Museums in Laos
Luang Namtha
Anthropology museums
Buildings and structures in Luang Namtha province